Asimakis Fotilas (Greek: Ασημάκης Φωτήλας) (1761–1835) was a Greek politician and a revolutionary leader.

Biography

He was born in Kalavryta and was a primate of Kalavryta, who later took part in the Greek War of Independence. Nearly two months before the start of the war, in January 1821, he took part in the Vostitsa council. In March 1821, he took part in the Ayia Lavra council and supported the idea of immediate action against the Ottomans. He was vice-president of the Peloponnesian Senate and president of the parliament in 1822.  He took part in the Georgios Kountouriotis government in 1824 from which he resigned quickly and became a political opponent of Kountouriotis. He was prosecuted by Kountouriotis and his house was plundered.  Later, when King Otto came to power he was re-instated and became a general.

References
Istoria tis Ellinikis Epanastasis (Ιστορία της Ελληνικής Επανάστασης = History of the Greek Revolution), Spyridon Trikoupis, Nea Synora, A. A. Livani, Athens 1993 SET 
Peloponisii agonistes tou 1821, Nikitara apomnimonevmata (Πελοποννήσιοι αγωνιστές του 1821, Νικηταρά απομνημονεύματα = Peloponnesian Revolutionary Leaders in 1821, Nikitaras Memoirs), Fotakos, Vergina publishers, Athens 1996
Fotakou apomnimonevmata (Φωτάκου απομνημονεύματα = Fotakou Memoirs), Vergina, 1996
This article is translated and is based from the article at the Greek Wikipedia (el:Main Page)

1761 births
1835 deaths
People from Kalavryta
Ottoman-era Greek primates
Greek soldiers
Greek military leaders of the Greek War of Independence
Greek politicians